This is a list of the costliest or deadliest hailstorms on record.

Notable events

North America

Europe

Asia

South America 
No entries yet.

Africa

Oceania

Largest by country 
  15 July 1808 - Somerset, England, United Kingdom ~
  27 August 1973 - Cedoux, Saskatchewan, Canada, nicknamed Gawel stone at a diameter of heaviest at and  
  14 April 1986 - Gopalganj District, Bangladesh
  19 October 2021 - Yalboroo, Queensland, Australia (16 cm) 
  23 July 2010 - Vivian, South Dakota, United States (~ diameter & ~ circumference)
  28 July 2013 - Reutlingen, Baden-Württemberg, Germany (14.1 cm diameter & 360-380 g weight)

See also 
 List of weather records#Hail

References

Further reading

External links 
 50 most intense hailstorms in Britain  (TORRO)
 TORRO hail scales 
 USA hail Reports

1
 *Hail
Weather hazards
Weather-related lists
Costliest hailstorms
Lists by death toll